Gustave-Achille Laviarde (November 17, 1841 – March 16, 1902) was, from 1882 to his death, pretender to the Kingdom of Araucania and Patagonia under the name of "Achille I king of Araucanie".

Personal
Achille Laviarde was born to Bertrand Xavier Laviarde (1808–1867) and Marie Anne Rosalie Colmart (1812–1888) in Reims, France. On May 20, 1876, he married Marie Élisa Octavie Guéry (1852–1893) in London, England. The couple had no children.

Achille Laviarde was an active Bonapartiste, calling for the restoration of the French monarchy under the rule of a descendant of Napoleon Bonaparte. He was implicated in the "Affaire du Comité Rémois" which was investigated by the French Parliament in 1875.

He died in Paris, France, on March 16, 1902.

Pretender to the throne of Araucania and Patagonia
In 1882, three and a half years after the death on September 17, 1878 of Orelie-Antoine de Tounens, Achille Laviarde invoked a will of this one in his favor to proclaim himself pretender to the throne of Araucania and Patagonia under the name Achille I. On March 26, 1882, he asked the nephew of Antoine de Tounens to give up the throne of Araucania, invoking the last wishes of Antoine de Tounens.

Previously, on August 28, 1873 the Criminal Court of Paris ruled that Antoine de Tounens, first king of Araucania and Patagonia did not justify his status  of sovereign.

The pretenders to the throne of Araucania and Patagonia are called monarchs and sovereigns of fantasy, "having only fanciful claims to a kingdom without legal existence and having no international recognition".

Bibliography
 Bruno Fuligny, L'Etat c'est moi: Histoire des monarchies privées, principautés de fantaisie et autres républiques pirates, Paris 1998.
 Simon de Schryver, Le Royaume d’Araucanie-Patagonie, Antoingt, 1887.
 Philippe Boiry aka "Philippe prince d´Araucanie", Histoire du Royaume d´Araucanie (1860–1979), une dynastie de princes français en Amérique Latine. S.F.A., Paris 1979, 468 p.

References

External links 
Royal House of Araucania and Patagonia
Mapuche International Link
North American Araucanian Royalist Society

Araucania
Kings of Araucania
1841 births
1902 deaths